Desna or Desná may refer to:

Places

Towns and villages
Dešná (Jindřichův Hradec District), a municipality and village in the South Bohemian Region of the Czech Republic
Dešná (Zlín District), a municipality and village in the Zlín Region of the Czech Republic
Desná (Jablonec nad Nisou District), a town in the Liberec Region of the Czech Republic
Desná (Svitavy District), a municipality and village in the Pardubice Region of the Czech Republic
Desna, Kozelets Raion, a town in Chernihiv Oblast of Ukraine
Desna, Vinnytsia Raion, a town in Vinnytsia Oblast of Ukraine
Desna, Bihar, a village in Nalanda District of Bihar, India

Rivers
Desna (river), a river in Russia and Ukraine
Desna (Vrbas), a river in Bosnia and Herzegovina
Desna (Guslitsa), a tributary of the Guslitsa, a river in Moscow Oblast, Russia
Desna (Pakhra), a tributary of the Pakhra, a river in Moscow Oblast, Russia
Desna (Southern Bug), a tributary of the Southern Bug in Ukraine
Desná (Kamenice), a tributary of the Kamenice, a river in the Jizera Mountains of the Czech Republic
White Desná and Black Desná, rivers in the Jizera Mountains of the Czech Republic
Desná (Morava), river in the Jeseník Mountains of the Czech Republic

Other
 R-9 Desna, Russian intercontinental ballistic missile
 FC Desna Chernihiv, a Ukrainian football club based in Chernihiv
 Desná Dam, a former dam, collapsed in 1916
 Fictional entities
 Desna, an Azure Striker Gunvolt 2 character